The GCC Champions League, is an annually organized football league tournament for club of the Arabian Peninsula. The 2001 edition was the 18th edition. 

The competition started on January 3, 2001, and concluded on January 14, in which  Al Ain lifted the trophy for the first time ever.

Results

''All match were played in  United Arab Emirates.

Round 1

Round 2

Round 3

Round 4

Round 5

References

 
 

GCC Champions League
Gulf Club Champions Cup, 2001